"Remember Me with Love" is a song by Cuban-American singer and songwriter Gloria Estefan. It was released in 1991 in the United Kingdom only as the third official single from her second album, Into the Light (1991). The US saw "Can't Forget You" as the third official single from the album, whereas "Nayib’s Song (I Am Here for You)" was released in some European markets as the third official single from the aforementioned album. "Remember Me with Love" was a moderate hit in the UK, reaching the top 30 and was promoted with a music video featuring a live performance by Estefan at a concert in the Netherlands.

Critical reception
Matthew Hocter from Albumism noted that "Remember Me with Love" is "a love song clearly dedicated to her husband. Stripped back, melancholic and raw, it is an extra layer of gratitude within an already grateful album. Beautiful." Bill Wyman from Entertainment Weekly wrote that the song is "distinctive", "simple, plaintive, and unpretentious."

Official versions
Original versions
 Album version  — 4:36
 Single edit — 3:58

Charts

Track listings and formats

References

External links

1991 singles
Gloria Estefan songs
Songs written by Gloria Estefan
1990 songs
1991 songs
Epic Records singles